Agelaea may refer to:
 Agelaea (beetle), a genus of insects in the family Carabidae
 Agelaea (plant), a genus of plants in the family Connaraceae